Ariomardus was the name of a number of people from classical antiquity:
 A son of the Persian King Darius I and his wife Parmys. He attended Xerxes I into Greece, being in command of the Moschi and Tibareni.
 The brother of Artuphius, who commanded the Caspii in the army of Xerxes I.
 The ruler of Thebes in Egypt, and one of the commanders of the Egyptians in the army of Xerxes.

References

Further reading 
The history of Herodotus, Volume 2 at Project Gutenberg

Persian people of the Greco-Persian Wars
5th-century BC Iranian people